John A. Shepherd (born 1962) is an American physicist, professor of epidemiology and population sciences and director of the Shepherd Research Laboratory at the University of Hawaii Cancer Center in Honolulu, Hawaii. He is an expert in the use of dual-energy X-ray absorptiometry (DXA) for quantitative bone and soft tissue imaging, and pioneered the use of 3D optical imaging of the whole body for quantifying body composition and associated diseases including cancer risk, obesity, diabetes, and frailty. In 2016, he was the President of the Board of the International Society for Clinical Densitometry.

Early life and education

Shepherd was born in Austin, Texas in 1962. He studied engineering physics at Texas Tech University in Lubbock, Texas where he obtained his Bachelor of Science degree. He continued his education at the University of Virginia in Charlottesville, Virginia, where he received his PhD in engineering physics in 1993. He was the first to develop scintillating vapor-deposited Na(Tl) thin films for photon counting imaging detectors grown with a columnar structure for high spatial resolution. He did his postdoctoral studies in biophysics at the Princeton University, where he adapted a phosphor created for color TV to emit green light well matched to the absorption of modern solid state detectors with very fast light output.

Career

Shepherd designs and develops dual-energy X-ray absorptiometry systems, mammography and 3D optical biomarkers used to evaluate the risk of osteoporosis, breast cancer, and obesity. He serves as the principal investigator for the National Institute of Diabetes and Digestive and Kidney Diseases funded Shape Up! Adults and Kids cohort.

Since 2020, Shepherd and his research team at the University of Hawaii Honolulu Cancer Center are working on Astro-3DO, the project which will use 3D optical cameras to measure the body shape and mass composition of astronauts in space. The work is supported by The Translational Research Institute for Space Health (TRISH).

Since 2021, he was appointed as Deputy Director and Chief Scientific Officer at the University of Hawaii Honolulu Cancer Center.

Awards and recognition

 1988 - Tau Beta Pi Engineering Honor Society (Texas Beta)
 2002 - BIRCWH Scholar (Building Institutional Research Careers in Women's Health) NIH
 2007 - John P. Bilezikian Global Leadership Award, International Society for Clinical Densitometry (ISCD)
 2013 - Oscar Gluck Humanitarian Award, ISCD
 2013 - Fulbright Scholar, Karolinska Institute, Stockholm, Sweden Fulbright Program, United States Department of State
 2016 - President of ISCD
 2021 - American Institute of Biological and Medical Engineering Fellow

Patents

 Multiple modality body composition analysis
 Bone densitometry using x-ray imaging systems
 Determining body composition using fan beam dual-energy x-ray absorptiometry
 Methods and apparatus for determining proportions of body materials

See also

 International Society for Clinical Densitometry

References

Further reading

 Bibliography at the US National Library of Medicine
 Google Scholar citations

External links
 SRL official website

Living people
1962 births
American physicists
Medical physicists
People from Austin, Texas